La Celle-Condé is a commune in the Cher department in the Centre-Val de Loire region of France.

Geography

Population

Sights
 A fifteenth-century stone cross
 The church of St. Denis, dating from the eleventh century
 A fifteenth century manorhouse
 The priory church of Saint-Germain
 A seventeenth century presbytery

See also
Communes of the Cher department

References

External links

Website of La Celle-Condé 

Communes of Cher (department)